Jules Earnest "Zuck" Carlson (November 4, 1904 – January 21, 1986) was an American football offensive lineman who played for the Chicago Bears from 1929-1936. He played in 3 title games, winning the championship twice in 1932 and 1933.

Born in Idaho, Carlson grew up in The Dalles, Oregon and attended The Dalles High School. He played college football at Oregon State University. Along with many of his Chicago Bears teammates, he appeared in the 1934 short film Pro Football.

Following his football career, Carlson lived in Chicago and worked as a pipefitter and part-time welding instructor until his retirement in 1972. He died in Chicago in 1986.

References

External links

1904 births
1986 deaths
People from The Dalles, Oregon
American football offensive linemen
Chicago Bears players
Oregon State Beavers football players